Claudia Cassidy (1899 – July 21, 1996), was an influential, 20th-century American performing arts critic.  She was a long-time critic for the Chicago Tribune.

Starting in 1925 she was music and drama critic for The Journal of Commerce. She was so well known for giving caustic reviews to what she considered bad performances that she earned the nickname "Acidy Cassidy."  Cassidy had a particular aversion to touring companies of  Broadway shows.  In music criticism, according to a 1993 article by the Chicago Reader, Rafael Kubelik, was "practically hounded out of town" by Cassidy.  

Although she had a reputation for biting critique, Cassidy's enthusiasm may have been even more powerful.  Her sustained praise for The Glass Menagerie over several columns is credited with rescuing the show from closing in tryouts and propelling it to move on to Broadway success. According to Philip Rose, A Raisin in the Sun became a hit after a surprise positive review from Cassidy as well as "good reviews in other papers." In 1975, Cassidy was awarded the Joseph Jefferson Award. Her last published writing was for the 1990-91 Lyric Opera program book.

Cassidy was married to William J. Cassidy for 57 years.  After her husband died in 1986, Cassidy lived at the Drake Hotel until her death in 1996 at the age of 96.

The Claudia Cassidy Theater of the Chicago Cultural Center is named in her honor.

Books 
 Cassidy, Claudia, Europe on the Aisle, New York: Random House, 1954
 Cassidy, Claudia, Lyric Opera of Chicago, Chicago IL: Lyric Opera of Chicago, 1979

References

External links
 Claudia Cassidy Papers at the Newberry Library

1899 births
1996 deaths
American music critics
American dance critics
American theater critics
People from Shawneetown, Illinois
Journalists from Illinois
Chicago Tribune people
American women journalists
American women music critics
Women writers about music
20th-century American journalists
20th-century American women